James Eugene Wohlford (born February 28, 1951) is an American former professional baseball player. He played in Major League Baseball (MLB) as an outfielder from 1972 to 1986 for the Kansas City Royals, Milwaukee Brewers, San Francisco Giants, and the Montreal Expos.

Baseball career 
Wohlford spent most of his career as a reserve outfielder, typically in left field. He was often used as a defensive replacement due to his fielding skills. With the 1974 Kansas City Royals,  he had a batting average of .271. 1974 was the only year Wohlford ever had more than 500 at bats. He had a .260 career batting average.

He signed a five-year free agent contract with the San Francisco Giants on December 12, 1979.

During his Major League career, he became notable for saying the line, "Ninety percent of this game is half-mental."

Post playing career 
After his playing career ended, Wohlford has worked as a financial planner in Visalia, California.

References

Sources

1951 births
Living people
American expatriate baseball players in Canada
Baseball players from California
Billings Mustangs players
College of the Sequoias Giants baseball players
Kansas City Royals players
Major League Baseball left fielders
Milwaukee Brewers players
Montreal Expos players
Nashville Sounds players
San Francisco Giants players
San Jose Bees players
Sportspeople from Visalia, California
Omaha Royals players